Pensions Expert is a specialist publication in the United Kingdom for the UK workplace pensions industry and is published by the Financial Times. It was established in January 1997.

History 
Pensions Expert was originally launched by FT Magazines as Pensions Week in January 1997. Its launch editor was Andrew Michael, former editor of headlinemoney. It was the first news-led title to cover the UK pensions industry.

In 2008 it became part of the Financial Publishing division of the Financial Times, which includes other financial publications such as The Banker, Investors Chronicle, Money Management and fDi Magazine.

The FT re-launched Pensions Week as Pensions Expert in January 2014 to reflect its web-first editorial approach.

Print Circulation 

The magazine is published weekly and had a total average net circulation per issue of 7,993 from 1 July 2013 to 30 June 2014, according to the Audited Bureau of Circulations (ABC). Ninety-nine per cent of its circulation is in the UK.

Content 

Pensions Expert publishes articles on defined benefit and defined contribution pension schemes, investments, derisking, auto-enrolment and legal and regulatory developments. It tailors its coverage for trustee boards and scheme management teams and focuses on news about what individual pension schemes are doing to provide retirement income for their members. Its tagline is "Informing scheme decisions."

FT PIPA Awards 

Each year, Pensions Expert host the Pension and Investment Provider Awards for providers of products and services to UK workplace pension schemes. Criteria used to adjudicate the awards are performance, innovation and service standards. The event has been held every year since 1999.

References

External links
 Official website

1997 establishments in the United Kingdom
Business magazines published in the United Kingdom
Weekly magazines published in the United Kingdom
Financial Times
Magazines established in 1997
Pensions in the United Kingdom